The second season of the Australian version of the original NBC American reality television series The Biggest Loser premiered on Sunday 4 February 2007 at 7pm on Network Ten, with the finale on 26 April 2007. The show features 14 overweight contestants competing for A$200,000 and the title Australia's Biggest Loser for 2007. The eventual winner was Chris Garling, one of "The Outsiders", who lost 70.1 kg (46.89% of his start weight). Eliminated contestants also had the chance to compete for a runners-up prize of $50,000, which was won by Michael losing 70.0 kg (42.37% of his start weight). Five episodes were screened each week night, with a sixth episode introduced on Sunday nights. Industry experts were skeptical of its success screening on this competitive night. The show averaged more than 1 million viewers each night, peaking at 1,995,000 viewers for the finale and 1,560,000 viewers for a weigh-in show. Over 10,000 Australians applied, 2,000 more than the 2006 season. The show is licensed and produced by FremantleMedia Australia in association with Reveille.

14 contestants (2 more than the previous season) competed in 2 teams, later becoming pairs and then playing individually. An additional four being introduced throughout the game as part of twists or as replacement contestants. In the first two weeks, one contestant voluntarily quit and one withdrew on medical advice.

Two new Australian trainers, Michelle Bridges and Shannan Ponton, were introduced to replace the previous American trainers Bob Harper and Jillian Michaels who reprised their role temporarily. Although Michelle states she doesn't like the format of the reality television show, she feels in the end it is helping change people's lives. Jillian was ridiculed for participating in the Australian version and not the American version, she stated that the Australian show represented her more accurately. Contestants were also introduced to former SAS soldier Steve Willis, dubbed "The Commando". Bob and Jillian left at the end of the second week, revisiting in the eighth week for a final time.

Two main new elements were introduced to the game including "The Walk" which gave contestants power to change the outcome of the game and a further two contestants were "secretly" trained outside the house and entered as "The Outsiders".

Before going to air, there were various allegations that Australian Idol winner Casey Donovan had applied to be a contestant and had been rejected. Network Ten argued that Donovan had simply not survived the application process. Further criticism was received by exercise experts, saying the show promoted risky weight loss techniques and may endanger the show's viewers. There was also much criticism of contestants leaving on medical advise after multiple health scares.

Season Overview

Game variations
Immunity: A small change to immunity was that the contestant to win immunity retained it for the following week if no other contestant gained immunity.

"The Walk": A new element known as "The Walk" involved the winner of the immunity challenges having a random choice of four game-altering options. Some options included a 24-hour training prior to the first weigh-in, choosing replacement contestants, swapping team members, giving up immunity, and immediate mid-week elimination.

New Trainers: Two new primary Australian trainers were introduced, who appeared to replace the previous American trainers. A third element was former SAS soldier Steve Willis dubbed "The Commando" who was used for rewards or penalties in challenges. The Commando trained "The Outsiders" at a secondary training secret ranch before they entered the game.

"The Outsiders": Two contestants called "The Outsiders", Chris Garling and Kimberlie Stewart, entered the game in week 7, having been weighed in the white house at the beginning of the game without the knowledge of all other contestants. They were trained with the Commando during the 6 weeks before entering the house and formed a pair upon entering the game.

"Wild card" contestant: As with the previous season, all previously eliminated contestants were invited to return to the game for a second chance "wild card" entry back into the game. The difference with this game element was that only 5 out of the returning 10 contestants could enter the game by winning a qualification weigh-in. All eliminated contestants returned except for walk-out contestants Sarah, Jules and Sam. P'eta chose not to return, similar to Tracy from the first season.

Trainer's Choice Award: At the end of the series a Suzuki Grand Vitara was awarded to Jules by the trainers, recognizing her for "handling herself exquisitely throughout the whole show".

List of episodes

There were a total of 68 episodes that followed the general weekly format of Elimination, Minor Challenge, Temptation, "The Walk", Major Challenge, and The Weigh-in. In some instances, episodes were replaced with specials where major twists were introduced, or previous events were explained for viewers missing information. Some of these special episodes included:
Two contestants leave: Due to unexpected withdrawal of contestants, episode 3 in week 1 focussed on this event.
The game so far: In week 6 was a recap episode where all previous episodes were summarised.
Duos Decided: In week 6 teams were separated into pairs. Damien won the minor challenge and power to choose pairs.
The Biggest Twist Thus Far; The Outsiders: The secret contestants training on the outside for 6 weeks enter the house in week 7.
Make Overs: Remaining contestants were given new clothes and hairstyles for a magazine photo-shoot in mid week 8.
Fear Challenges: Replacing the regular spot for "The Walk", fear challenges were personal mental challenges that each remaining contestant participated in, for no tangible reward. The 6 remaining contestants were flown to Queenstown, New Zealand. Courtney went on a large cliff swing, Chris used a rocket swing, Damien and Kimberlie rock climbed a 30 m cliff face, Munnalita bungee jumped and Pati participated in white water sports
Mountain hike: Contestants participated in a mountain hike, add weighted bags weighing the amount of weight they had lost each week. All contestants reaching the mountain peak carrying the weight they started the show with. The experience was to feel the relief when they removed their backpacks. Kimberlie added an extra 40 kg to match what she was at her heaviest weight.
Return of the eliminated contestants: On being invited back for a chance to enter back into the game, contestants went through various challenges:
Second chance challenge: Contestants were required to hold two medicine balls whilst balancing on a series of three varied sized logs, each one smaller than the last, for half an hour each. Mel, who had an ankle problem stepped down and was immediately eliminated. Gerard won the challenge, Kelly coming a close second.
Second chance temptation: Contestants had a 1 in 6 chance to receive a wild card chance, elimination and other prizes. Laura won a guarantee qualification, Greg was immediately eliminated. Other prizes included a trip won by Kelly, a scooter won by Alex, a small hamburger and chips won by Damien, and a chocolate platter won by Courtney. Michael and Marty chose not to participate in the temptation challenge.
Super Challenge: Remaining contestants competed in a sand dune and mental challenge, with the three remaining places going to Michael, Marty and Damien. Courtney, Alex and Kelly were immediately eliminated.
Train the trainers: Mid week 11 contestants were tested with their knowledge of training routines in preparation for moving outside of the game. 
Trainer's Choice Award: The episode before the finale was a consolation for Jules who withdrew from the show on medical advice. She was given a Suzuki Grand Vitara

The Weigh-Ins
At the end of each week, contestants must be weighed to determine how much weight they had lost since the previous week or weigh in. Generally the person with the highest weight loss receives immunity. With teams, the total percentage of weight loss for the team must be highest to avoid elimination. With pairs and individuals, players must come in "above the yellow line" which is usually the 2 lowest weight losers of the week. Weigh-in episodes were generally screened on Sunday nights, or left as a cliffhanger and combined with elimination episodes.

Standing
 Week's Biggest Loser
 Immunity
 The Biggest Loser
 Winner of the At-Home prize

Eliminations
Each week, after a weigh in, contestants must cast a vote against another contestant and avoid elimination. The contestant that received the most votes left the game immediately. Contestants can avoid elimination by their team or themselves losing the most percentage of weight loss, winning immunity at a temptation challenge. Contestants make themselves an elimination target if they are a threat of losing a lot of weight by the end of the show. Elimination episodes screened on Mondays. Below is a table of voting history for what each contestant voted.

 Immunity
 Immunity, unable to vote
 Below yellow line, unable to vote
 Finished last in the elimination challenge, eliminated
 Not in elimination, unable to vote
 Vote not revealed
 Eliminated or not in house
 Last person eliminated before the finale
 Valid vote cast
Elimination notes
Sarah quit in week 1 due to feeling isolated from the rest of the group. All four trainers and former contestant Cat from season 1 failed to convince her to stay in the game.
Sam withdrew in week 1 due to deep vein thrombosis.
P'eta was unexpectedly eliminated as part of a twist introduced by "The Walk". Munnalita had the choice to eliminate a female contestant and chose P'eta.
Jules withdrew in week 5 due to irregular heart patterns. Despite the contestants wanting her to stay, the on-site medic advised her to leave the game.
Damien was eliminated in week 9 as a result of a Super Challenge. The penalty for losing the challenge was to be immediately eliminated.
Damien's elimination marked the first time that an entire team was eliminated before the finale. He and Laura returned two weeks later and were eliminated again. With their eliminations, trainers Bob and Shannan had lost their entire team, and thus they both were also eliminated from the competition, as they had no other contestants to represent them at the finale. However, both trainers still remained in the house to train their former rival contestants.
Marty was also eliminated twice. His first elimination was by a "hung" or tied vote in week 5, giving the voting decision to the other team. Upon returning to the game, Marty secured immunity in week 8 but was voted out as he had gained weight at the weigh-in, stripping him of his eligibility of immunity, and was subsequently re-eliminated. He also returned twice, returning again in week 10 after his second elimination, and went on to become a finalist.
Chris and Pati are the only contestants to have not been eliminated, but Pati is the only contestant to be in the game for the entire length of the season, Chris entered the game in week 6.

Minor challenges
Contestants must compete in challenges to earn individual or team rewards. These rewards often lead to giving contestants power to change the outcome of the game with weight advantages or penalties, or individual personal prizes generally awarded by the shows advertising suppliers or sponsors. Generally, minor challenges were screened on Tuesday nights.

Major Challenges
Contestants compete in more demanding physical, mental or tempting challenges giving contestants more significant prizes than those awarded with minor challenges giving contestants power to change the outcome of the game, change team setup, or earn immunity. Generally, major challenges were screened as a cliffhanger episode on Friday nights.

Temptation
Contestants competes in a temptation challenge to secure their place in the game for another week by gaining immunity making them unable to be voted out unless they gain weight. Challenges are generally psychologically based and gave contestants the choice to act against temptations they would otherwise participate in. This is a strategic part of the game. Temptation challenges were generally screened on Wednesday nights.

"The Walk"
As an addition to receiving immunity, contestants also receive the power of "The Walk" which gave them the choice to change the game from options provided to them. "The Walk" was generally screened on Thursday nights.

Finale
The finale was a pre-recorded show which aired on 6 April 2007.

Final 3 Contestants: Non-eliminated contestants competed for the "crown" and official label of "Australia's Biggest Loser for 2007", the winner being Chris losing a total of 70.1 kg (46.89% of his start weight).

Runner-up Contestants: All other contestants (excluding Sam, Jules and Sarah) weighed in against each other for the runner-up prize of A$50,000. The winner by a small margin was Michael, closely followed by Munnalita.

Disqualified contestants: Contestants Jules and Sam weighed in at the Finale but their results were not counted towards the runners-up prize as they were disqualified from play as they withdrew from the game, even though it was for medical reasons. Sarah did not make a finale appearance.

Cast and personalities

Host
Ajay Rochester returned to the second season reprising her role as host of the show. Ajay has since stated goals for herself after the completion of this season, moving into hosting a radio show. Before the show went to air, Ajay was under the spotlight for her own weight. During primary production of the show, Ajay appeared on Network Ten's New Years celebrations.

Trainers
Bob Harper (US trainer)
Jillian Michaels (US trainer)
Michelle Bridges (New Australian trainer)
Shannan Ponton (New Australian trainer)
Steve Willis (Australian Commando)
Professor Clare Collins (Nutritionist and dietitian)

Contestants

14 contestants started the game, 2 more than the previous season. As a result of contestant withdrawal, "The Outsiders" and replacements, the total number of contestants was 18.

Original Contestants

The Outsiders

Replacement Contestants
The replacement contestants were selected from a choice of four people as part of "The Walk".

The two people that did not become contestants were Jess and Kelli. Laura and P'eta joined the team.

Disqualified Contestants

Team arrangements
Teams: The show started with two teams, "Blue Team" trained by Bob and Shannan and "Red Team" trained by Jillian and Michelle. The Australian trainers entered the game and individually the contestants chose their trainers, with the heaviest contestant choosing first (Damien) and the lightest choosing last (Mel). Bob and Jillian then entered and joined the Shannan and Michelle respectively as co-trainers. As teams became uneven throughout the game, some challenge rewards or penalties were to swap team members which retained even numbers for teams to compete fairly.

Duos: With 8 contestants remaining, teams were broken into 4 pairs of male and female contestants. Damien won the power to choose teams as a result of a minor challenge. At this stage of the game, Jules left the game making an uneven number of contestants, leaving Damien with the decision to leave one contestant to compete by themselves. The pairs grouped together were: Damien and Laura, Greg and Mel, Courtney and Munnalita, and Pati was left by herself which introduced a new twist. The biggest weight loser of all eliminated contestants returned to the game, this being Marty who was only just eliminated the day before. Greg and Mel were eliminated as part of a double elimination, and were replaced by new contestants Chris and Kimberlie, introduced as "The Outsiders".

Individuals: With 7 contestants remaining (including the new "The Outsiders"), pairs no longer existed and contestants competed in all challenges individually.

Final 4: The final four contestants were Chris, Kimberlie, Pati and Munnalita. As a result of the "wild card" challenge, contestant Marty returned to the game and replaced eliminated contestant Kimberlie, making Marty part of the final 4 contestants.

Production and release

Filming locations
Filming of The Biggest Loser was primarily located in Sydney, NSW, Australia. The main filming locations seen throughout the show are the White House (where contestants reside and train), the "Outsider" training ranch (where "The Outsiders" trained before entering the house), the elimination room (a room inside the house where votes are cast for contestants to be eliminated from the game) and the diary room (a studio set up for contestants to leave video entries of their time in the house). Other game locations include "The Walk" which was filmed around Bobbin Head National Park, Turramurra, NSW. Other filming locations include areas around the house gardens for individual contestant interviews. There are also filming locations at South Sydney beaches and other areas where challenges take place. Areas of Queenstown, New Zealand were also primary filming locations as part of the New Zealand Super Challenge, the focus points being the hike and sprint up Coronet Peak and the Super Challenge at Paradise. There are also the studios for the live finale reunion.

Filming dates
There are three main dates organised around the production of the show including the application and audition process, primary photography and production  and the show finale which occurs 6 weeks after the final week of primary photography (the tenth week of game play), and was filmed on Monday, 23 April (instead of a live show like the previous season).

Air dates and channels
This season began airing on Sunday 4 February 2007 at 7:00pm on Network Ten, five episodes each week night, with an additional sixth episode introduced on Sunday nights. After a total of 67 episodes (10 × 6 weeklies) the pre-taped finale episode screened on 26 April 2007.

Credits and associations
The Biggest Loser is a trademark of Reveille LLC and is licensed and produced by FremantleMedia Australia Pty Limited. In Australia it is distributed by Crackerjack Productions, Grundy-Fremantle Media Group and Network Ten Australia. Among others, the major sponsors and suppliers that were explicitly credited were 100% Pure newzealand.com, Accredited Practising Dieticians, Air New Zealand, Brooks, Chrysler, Fernwood Health Club, LG Electronics, Workout World and Valiant Hire.

Reception and public response

Controversies
Casey Donovan: Before the show went to air, there were some controversies when allegations emerged that morbidly obese singer and Australian Idol series two winner Casey Donovan had applied to be a contestant and had been rejected. Network Ten dismissed these allegations, arguing that Donovan had simply not survived the application process.

Health risks:
The show received further criticism, being attacked by exercise experts for promoting risky weight loss techniques that may endanger the show's viewers. There was also much criticism when news leaked of contestant Jules, then unknown, was forced to quit after multiple health scares and hospital visits. An eating disorders support group, The Butterfly Foundation, commenting on Chris's achievement, warned that such a dramatic weight loss could be a health risk.

New trainers:
With Shannan and Michelle introduced, this was a tactic to make sure that in the future series of the Biggest Loser, the two trainers will be Shannan and Michelle. By doing this, they hope that the Australian public can appreciate them as much as Bob and Jillian and to make future series of Biggest Loser an all Australian cast.

Reviews
The length of the show compared to the American version was accused of being too "bloated" with over 3 hours of extra footage for each "episode" or week, but at the same time, the type of participants used in the show are a good change from regular reality television "wannabes".

Television viewing and ratings

The show averaged more than 1,000,000 viewers each night, peaking around 1.56 million viewers for one weigh-in show and 1.31 million viewers for one elimination show. The season premiere attracted only 1.17 million viewers compared to the first season premiere of 1.4 million, although depending on what was happening with the Cricket on Channel Nine, the total audience peaked at 1.45 million. The ratings were considered a great success by the network, receiving a large portion of the target demographic (39.2% commercial share in demographic ages 18–49, and 42.6% of the 16-39 demographic). The season finale was the ratings success, being the highest rating episode of the show and ranking number 1 for the day with 1,995,000 viewers.

The following are some of the ratings achieved from the highest-rated episodes. Unless otherwise stated, sources are gathered from OzTAM as a primary or secondary source.

References

External links

Official websites
Official The Biggest Loser website
Official The Biggest Loser merchandise shop

Resources

Contestants
Damien Wicks on Myspace
Mel Russell on Myspace

Australia (season 2)
2007 Australian television seasons